Sandra Cecchini and Patricia Tarabini were the defending champions, but the pair decided to compete at Kitzbühel in the same week, losing in the final.

Laura Garrone and Karin Kschwendt won the title by defeating Leona Lásková and Jana Pospíšilová 6–0, 1–6, 7–6(8–6) in the final.

Seeds

Draw

Draw

References

External links
 Official results archive (ITF)
 Official results archive (WTA)

Athens Trophy
1990 WTA Tour